Maria Louise may refer to:
 Maria Louise Baldwin (1856–1922), African American educator and civic leader
Maria Louise Kirk (1860–1938), an American painter and illustrator
 Princess Maria Louise, a character in the fictional anime Mobile Fighter G Gundam

See also
 Maria Louisa
 Maria Luisa
 Maria Luise
 Marie Louise (disambiguation)
 Marie Luise